House Of Pleasure is the second studio album by reggaeton duo Plan B. It was released on February 3, 2011 through Sony Music Latin and Pina Records. It features two singles: the lead, "Si No Le Contesto" and "Es un Secreto". "Si No Le Contesto" peaked at #37 on the Billboard Hot Latin Songs chart.

Track listing
 "Intro"
 "Tarde En La Noche"
 "¿Por Qué Te Demoras?"
 "La Nena De Papi" (featuring Tito El Bambino)
 "Si No Le Contesto"
 "Es un Secreto"
 "El Amor No Existe"
 "Lloras" (featuring R.K.M & Ken-Y)
 "Nos Fuimos Discoteca"
 "Partysera" (featuring De La Ghetto)
 "El Que La Hace La Paga"
 "Mis Canciones Hablan De Sexo" (featuring J-King & Maximan)
 "¿Qué Me Paso?"
 "House Of Pleasure"
 "Outro"

Charts

Music videos
Si No Le Contesto
Es un Secreto

References

2010 albums
Albums produced by Nely
Pina Records albums
Plan B (duo) albums